is a Japanese ice sledge hockey player. He was part of the Japanese sledge hockey team that won a silver medal at the 2010 Winter Paralympics.

Both his legs were amputated following an accident when he was 22.

References

External links 
 
 

1983 births
Living people
Japanese sledge hockey players
Paralympic sledge hockey players of Japan
Paralympic silver medalists for Japan
Ice sledge hockey players at the 2010 Winter Paralympics
Medalists at the 2010 Winter Paralympics
People from Asahikawa
Sportspeople from Hokkaido
Japanese amputees
Paralympic medalists in sledge hockey